Atchison may refer to:

Places 
In the United States:
Atchison, California, a former settlement
Atchison, Kansas, a city
Atchison County, Kansas
Atchison County, Missouri

People with the surname 
Bob Atchison (born 1941), Canadian drag racer
Dave Atchison (born 1979), American drummer and musician
David Rice Atchison (1807-1886), US senator from Missouri
Don Atchison, Canadian politician
Doug Atchison, American motion picture director and screenwriter
Drew Atchison (born 1985), former American football tight end
Edward Goodrich Acheson (1856-1931), American chemist
Jim Atchison, American business executive of SeaWorld Parks & Entertainment
John David Roy Atchison (1954–2007), Assistant US Attorney and children's sports coach, committed suicide in prison after being charged with soliciting sex from a 5-year-old girl 
Michael Atchison (1933-2009), Australian cartoonist
Ron Atchison (1930-2010), Canadian football defensive lineman
Scott Atchison (born 1976), American former professional baseball pitcher
Scott Atchison (racing driver) (born 1962), former American racing driver
Tim Atchison (born 1987), former American football safety
William Atchison (1996-2017), perpetrator of the 2017 Aztec High School shooting

Railroad 
Atchison, Topeka and Santa Fe Railway

Music 
"On the Atchison, Topeka and the Santa Fe", an Academy Award-winning song which refers to the railroad

See also
Acheson (disambiguation)